Leiopyrga is a genus of sea snails, marine gastropod mollusks in the family Trochidae, the top snails.

Description
The thin,  perforate, elongated, narrow shell is somewhat turreted. The whorls are convex, rounded or carinated. The oval aperture is small. The columella is arcuate, not truncated at its base. This genus differs from Bankivia by its umbilicus.

Species
 Leiopyrga cingulata Adams, 1864
 Leiopyrga lineolaris Gould, A.A., 1861
 Leiopyrga octona Tate, 1891
Species brought into synonymy
 Leiopyrga picturata H. & A. Adams, 1863: synonym of Leiopyrga lineolaris Gould, A.A., 1861

References

 Tate, R. 1891. Descriptions of new species of Australian Mollusca, recent and fossil. Transactions of the Royal Society of South Australia 14: 257-265 
 Cotton, B.C. (1959). South Australian Mollusca. Archaeogastropoda. Adelaide : Govt. Printer.
 Iredale, T. & McMichael, D.F. (1962). A reference list of the marine Mollusca of New South Wales. Memoirs of the Australian Museum. 11
 Wilson, B. (1993). Australian Marine Shells. Prosobranch Gastropods. Kallaroo, WA : Odyssey Publishing. Vol.1 1st Edn

External links
 OBIS: Leiopyrga

 
Trochidae
Gastropod genera